Reinaldo Oliver Martínez (28 March 1932 in Ponce, Puerto Rico – 19 January 2015 in San Juan, Puerto Rico) was a Puerto Rican former javelin thrower and decathlete who competed in the 1952 Summer Olympics and in the 1956 Summer Olympics. He won the bronze medal in the javelin at the 1955 Pan American Games. He was also a baseball player, and played at the Triple-A level for 18 games in 1961, with the San Juan/Charleston Marlins.

References

1932 births
2015 deaths
Puerto Rican baseball players
Puerto Rican male javelin throwers
Olympic track and field athletes of Puerto Rico
Sportspeople from Ponce, Puerto Rico
Athletes (track and field) at the 1952 Summer Olympics
Athletes (track and field) at the 1956 Summer Olympics
Pan American Games bronze medalists for Puerto Rico
Athletes (track and field) at the 1955 Pan American Games
Pan American Games medalists in athletics (track and field)
Competitors at the 1954 Central American and Caribbean Games
Central American and Caribbean Games gold medalists for Puerto Rico
Dothan Cardinals players
San Juan Marlins players
Lancaster Red Roses players
Winston-Salem Red Birds players
Winnipeg Goldeyes players
Central American and Caribbean Games medalists in athletics
Medalists at the 1955 Pan American Games